Clarkston railway station is a suburban side platform railway station in the town of Clarkston, East Renfrewshire, Scotland. The station is managed by ScotRail and is on the East Kilbride branch of the Glasgow South Western Line. It was opened in 1866 by the Busby Railway.

History 
The station was opened by the Busby Railway on 1 January 1866.  Services were subsequently extended through to East Kilbride by the Caledonian Railway two years later and eventually to High Blantyre (on the Hamilton and Strathaven Railway), though the section beyond East Kilbride closed back in the 1940s.  A further pair of connections to the Lanarkshire and Ayrshire Railway were subsequently constructed around 1903-4 by the latter company, though only the south to west one saw regular traffic and even then for just a few months.

The plans were not well received and were eventually dropped.

Services 

References

Notes

Sources 
 
 
 
 RAILSCOT on Busby Railway

External links 

 Historical timetables, maps and satellite imagery for Clarkston railway station.  See Timetable World - The online collection of historical transport timetables and maps from around the world

Railway stations in East Renfrewshire
SPT railway stations
Railway stations served by ScotRail
Railway stations in Great Britain opened in 1866
Former Caledonian Railway stations
1866 establishments in Scotland
Clarkston, East Renfrewshire